The Kopanoi (Greek: "THE...ΚΟΠΑΝΟΙ") is a Greek comedy film, released in 1987, written and directed by Giorgos Konstadinou, starring several famous Greek actors, including Konstadinou himself, Markos Lezes, Yannis Vouros, Kostas Palios, and Giorgos Petrohilos. Today the movie has reached cult classic status for its memorable quotes and is regarded as the ultimate Greek comedy from the 1980s cinema period.

Cast

Main characters 
 Leonidas (Giorgos Konstadinou) is the main character of the movie. A real life loser, he awaits orders from his boss (Babis) about his next plan regarding a bank robbery. He must assemble a "gang" to do the job, only to prove later in the film that they are not even able to close a single casket...
 Toufas (Markos Lezes) is a black belt martial art master, who got beaten really bad the last time he worked with Leonidas for Babis. He is not excited with the idea of robbing a bank, though he will eventually join the "gang" reluctantly.
 Mickey (Yannis Vouros) is a thief. He specializes in motor vehicle theft. Leonidas is a keen admirer of his abilities, mostly because Mickey has never spent a single day in prison. He wastes most of his time hanging out in discothèques.
 Doukas (Kostas Palios) is a gambler. A true gentleman who spends all of his day playing cards, and thus easy to be located. He always leaves the table having won by cheating. His bodyguard, Fouskas (see below), holds a key role in the film.
 Gogo (Giorgos Petrohilos) is Mickey's friend from the discothèque. Despite not being included in Leonidas's list at first, he will eventually join the "gang" and agrees to take a share from the bank robbery.
 Fouskas (Kostas Makedos) is the fat bodyguard working for Doukas. He gets beaten early in the film by three angry gamblers. Later he represents Doukas during the bank robbery and tries unsuccessfully to take the money.

External links

1987 films
Greek comedy films
1980s Greek-language films